Leslie William McGirr (born 8 October 1897, death date unknown) was an association footballer who represented New Zealand at international level.

McGirr made four appearances for the All Whites, all against the touring Canadians. His first match ended in a 2–2 draw on 25 June 1927, followed by a 1–2 loss, a 1–0 win and his final match a 1–4 loss on 23 July 1927.

His brother Herb McGirr played Test cricket for New Zealand.

References 

1897 births
Year of death missing
New Zealand association footballers
New Zealand international footballers
Association footballers not categorized by position
Australian military personnel of World War I